Dorothea Gillim (born July 18, 1964) is an American television producer. She is the creator of the animated series WordGirl and Hey Monie! and co-creator of Molly of Denali. Under GBH, Gillim has produced multiple animated series including Curious George, Pinkalicious & Peterrific, and Time Warp Trio.

In 2006, Gillim created WordGirl to respond to "the idea that children’s television wasn’t intelligent enough," feeling that most shows "underestimated their sense of humor and their intellect." In 2022, Collider praised the show for its "non-white, little girl superhero" protagonist, claiming it started a female superhero trend and the generation who grew up watching WordGirl later demanded new and diverse Marvel heroes such as Captain Marvel.

Gillim's co-created animation series Molly of Denali has been celebrated as "the nation’s first widely distributed children’s program featuring an Alaska Native as the lead character."

Career 
After graduating from Swarthmore College, Gillim was a fifth grade teacher in Philadelphia for three years before leaving to attend graduate school. She took interest in television writing following a media education course at Harvard Graduate School of Education.

Her 2003 adult animation series Hey Monie! was praised for its improvised comedic dialogue and for featuring Angela V. Shelton as Monie, the show's Black female protagonist.

In 2019, Tuca & Bertie creator Lisa Hanawalt mentioned Gillim's show Hey Monie! while compiling a list of adult animated shows created by women.

In 2022, regarding her co-creation of Molly of Denali, Gillim described the show as "long overdue" and stated, "We knew that this story was not ours to tell, and so our intention was to partner with Alaska Natives in the development of the characters in the world." NPR commended the show for debunking stereotypes, addressing discrimination, and presenting an educational representation of Alaskan Native culture.

See also 

 Susie Lewis, contemporaneous creator of adult animated sitcom Daria
 Pam Brady, creator of adult animated sitcom Neighbors from Hell
 Loren Bouchard, creator of other Soup2Nuts shows including Home Movies

References

External links 
 

American television producers
American women in television
Television producers from Massachusetts
1964 births
American animated film producers
American animated film directors
Curious George
WordGirl
Emmy Award winners
Peabody Award winners
Swarthmore College alumni
Harvard Graduate School of Education alumni
Living people
People from Cambridge, Massachusetts